Patrick Timsit is a French comedian, writer and film director. He has been nominated for four César Awards –  three times as an actor and once as a writer. He is best known for the French comedy Un indien dans la ville.

In 2006, he participated in Rendez-vous en terre inconnue. He is of Algerian Jewish ancestry.

Cesar nominations 
Best Supporting Actor – La Crise (1992)
Best Actor – Pédale douce (1996)
Best Screenplay – Pédale douce (1996)
Best Actor – Le cousin (1997)

Selected filmography 
 Sans peur et sans reproche (1988) as Charles VIII of France
 Mayrig (1991) as Garbis
 La Crise (1992) as Michou
 The Monster (1994) as Loris (French dub)
 Little Indian, Big City (1994)  as Richard Montignac
 La Belle Verte (1996) as the TV host
 Pedale douce (1996) as Adrien
 Le cousin (1997) as Lahcene "Nounours" Abdelrahmane
 Hercules (1997) as Philoctetes (French dub)
 Marquise (1997) as René "Gros René" Berthelot
 Paparazzi (1998) as Franck
 Quasimodo d'El Paris (1999 – directed) as Quasimodo
 Les 11 commandements (2001) as Toto
 L'Art (délicat) de la séduction (2001) as Etienne
 Atlantis: The Lost Empire (2001) as Gaëtan Moliére (French dub)
 The Car Keys (2003) as himself
 Shark Tale (2004) as Lenny (French dub)
 Azur and Asmar (2006) as Crapoux (voice)
 Dragon Hunters (2008) as Gwyzdo (voice)
 Sur la piste du Marsupilami (2012) as Caporal
 Robin des bois, la véritable histoire (2015) as Alfred
 Gangsterdam (2017) as Ruben's father
 Dalida (2017) as Bruno Coquatrix
 Marie-Francine (2017) as Miguel
 The Last Mercenary (2021) as Commander Jouard
 Brother and Sister (2022) as Zwy

References

External links 

Living people
1959 births
French male film actors
French film directors
French people of Algerian-Jewish descent
Jewish French male actors
People from Algiers
French screenwriters